This is a list of venues used for professional baseball in Houston, Texas. The information is a compilation of the information contained in the references listed.

Herald Park a.k.a. League Park, Fair Ground Park, and Houston Base Ball Park
Occupants:
Houston Nationals – Texas League (1884)
Houston Heralds – Independent (1887)
Houston Buffaloes (a.k.a. Babies and Lambs) – Texas League (1888–1904)
Location: At the intersection of Travis Street and McGowen Street in modern-day Midtown

West End Park – opened 1905
Occupants:
Houston Buffaloes – South Texas League (1905–1906)
Houston Buffaloes – Texas League (1907–1927)
Location: at Bagby Street and Jefferson Avenue (south, outside right field); Howe Street (east, left field); Andrews Street (north, third base); Heiner Street (west, first base)
Currently: approach ramps for Gulf Freeway (Interstate 45) and electrical power substation

Buffalo Stadium a.k.a. Busch Stadium 
Occupants:
Houston Buffaloes – Texas League (1928–1942,1946–1958)
Houston Buffaloes – American Association (1959–1961)
Houston Eagles – Negro American League (1949–1950)
Location: Leeland Street (north, left field); St. Bernard (now Cullen Boulevard) (east, right field); Coyle Street (south, first base); Milby Street (west, third base); in the East End 
Currently: Fingers Furniture Center and Houston Sports Museum

Colt Stadium
Occupant: Houston Colt .45s (Astros) – National League (1962–1964) 
Location: just north of Astrodome – on North Stadium Drive (east, right field); 
Currently: Reliant Center and parking lot

Astrodome 
Occupant: Houston Astros – National League (1965–1999)
Location: 8400 Kirby Drive (west); Fannin Street (east); Interstate 610 (south)

Minute Maid Park prev. Enron Field, then Astros Field
Occupant: Houston Astros – National League (2000–2012), American League (2013–present)
Also used as a neutral site in the 2020 MLB postseason
Location: 501 Crawford Street (northwest); Congress Street (northeast); Hamilton Street (southeast); Texas Street (southwest)
Previously: railroad yards and Union Station

See also
Lists of baseball parks

References
Peter Filichia, Professional Baseball Franchises, Facts on File, 1993.

External links
Early Houston baseball
Buffalo Stadium

Houston
 
baseball parks
Baseball parks